Maurice Bradley (born 5 April 1954) is a Unionist politician from Northern Ireland representing the Democratic Unionist Party (DUP). 

Bradley has been a Member of the Northern Ireland Assembly (MLA) for East Londonderry since the 2016 election.

Bradley served twice as mayor of Coleraine, firstly between 2007-2008 and later between 2011 and 2012. Bradley stood for the Northern Ireland Assembly in 2016, after Gregory Campbell stood down and was elected, in the first count, topping the poll.

Bradley was criticised in 2018 for sharing a post that described London mayor Sadiq Khan as "the enemy within" and defending a far-right march in Poland.

References

1954 births
Living people
Democratic Unionist Party MLAs
Northern Ireland MLAs 2016–2017
Northern Ireland MLAs 2017–2022
Politicians from County Londonderry
Northern Ireland MLAs 2022–2027